Yevgeny Ivanovich Goryansky (28 February 1929 – 13 July 1999) was a Russian football striker and football coach.

Career 
In 1945, he began his career in junior football for Dynamo Moscow. Then for three years he served in the military club OBO Lviv. After demobilization he returned to Moscow, where he was player of Lokomotiv Moscow. In 1956, as a result of severe injuries he was forced to end his playing career and began an illustrious coaching career.

In 1960, he graduated from the Pedagogical Institute in Luhansk. From 1958, he coached the Ukrainian clubs Zirka Kirovohrad, Sudnobudivelnyk Mykolaiv and Desna Chernihiv. In 1963, he worked as a manager of the club Karpaty Lviv, and later helped train Dynamo Kiev. In the years 1966-1967 he led the club FC Zorya Luhansk, then became director of Lokomotiv Moscow . From September 1968 to May 1969 he worked on the staff training team of the USSR, and later became Assistant Director of the Football Association Sports Committee of the USSR, where he worked until June 1970. After managing Zenit Leningrad in 1973, he was the Soviet national team coach. He then ran Dinamo Minsk, Dinamo Makhachkala and Dynamo Moscow. In the years 1980-1983 he re-trained, and from 1986-1988 he worked as a coach at the School of Sports of Lokomotiv Moscow. He died on July 13, 1999 in Moscow.

Goryanskiy was champion of the First League of the Soviet Union in 1975 with Dynamo Minsk. He won the title of Master of Sports of the USSR in 1967, title of Merited Coach of the Ukrainian SSR in 1963, the title of Merited Coach of the Russian SFSR in 1973 and the title of Merited Coach of the Byelorussian SSR in 1975.

References 

1929 births
Footballers from Moscow
1999 deaths
Soviet footballers
SKA Lviv players
FC Lokomotiv Moscow players
Soviet football managers
FC Zirka Kropyvnytskyi managers
MFC Mykolaiv managers
FC Desna Chernihiv managers
FC Zorya Luhansk managers
FC Zenit Saint Petersburg managers
Soviet Union national football team managers
FC Dinamo Minsk managers
FC Dynamo Moscow managers
Russian football managers
Association football midfielders
Association football forwards